Kauravi, also known as Khaṛībolī is a set of Western Hindi varieties of Shauraseni Prakrit mainly spoken in Northwestern Uttar Pradesh.

Standard Hindi and Urdu are based on the Hindustani derived from Khariboli, specifically on its Dehlavi dialect (Old Hindi). Hindustani gained prestige when it was accepted along with Persian as a language of the court, before that it was only a language the Persianate states spoke to their subjects in and later as a sociolect of the same ruling classes.

Modern Kauravi contains some features, such as gemination, which give it a distinctive sound and differentiates it from Braj, Awadhi, and Hindustani. An early form of Kauravi became the main basis of Old Hindi, which subsequently developed into Hindustani and then into Hindi and Urdu.

Geographical distribution

Khariboli is spoken in the rural surroundings of Delhi and northwestern Uttar Pradesh, as well as in some neighbouring areas of Haryana and Uttarakhand. The geography of this part of North India is traditionally described as doabs.

In Haryana, the following districts are Khari-speaking:
Kurukshetra
Ambala
Yamunanagar
Panchkula
Northern half of Faridabad
Eastern parts of Karnal, Sonepat, Panipat

In Uttar Pradesh, the following districts of the Yamuna-Ganges doab are Khari-speaking:

Saharanpur
Muzaffarnagar
Shamli
Baghpat
Meerut
Ghaziabad
Hapur
Bulandshahr
Gautam Buddha Nagar

In the trans-Ganges area, it is spoken in the following districts of Rohilkhand region in Uttar Pradesh:
Moradabad
Rampur
Sambhal
Bareilly
Badaun
Amroha
Bijnor

In Uttarakhand, the following districts of the Yamuna-Ganges doab are partially Khari-speaking:
Haridwar
Dehradun

In the trans-Ganges area, it is partially spoken in the following districts of Uttarakhand:

Nainital only in the Terai region which has a significant population of immigrants from Uttar Pradesh. 
Udham Singh Nagar

Khariboli in Hindustani popular culture
Khariboli is often seen as rustic by speakers of Standard Hindustani, and elements of it were used in Hum Log, India's first television soap opera, where the main family was depicted as having roots in Western Uttar Pradesh.

As the two main Hindustani dialects of Western Uttar Pradesh and the areas surrounding Delhi, Khariboli and Braj Bhasha are often compared. On the other hand, Khariboli supporters sometimes pejoratively referred to Braj Bhasha and other dialects as "Pariboli".

Kauravi and Sankrityayan's proposal
Although most linguists acknowledge that Modern Standard Hindustani descended from Khariboli, the precise mechanism of dialectical changes from Khari to the prestige dialect (such as the loss of gemination which is so prevalent in Khari) lacks consensus. There are also variations within Khari itself across the area in which it is spoken. In the mid-twentieth century, Indian scholar and nationalist, Rahul Sankrityayan, proposed a redrawing of the linguistic map of the Hindustani zone. Drawing a distinction between the Khari of Old Delhi and the Khari of the extreme western parts of Western Uttar Pradesh, he advocated that the former retain the name Khariboli while the latter be renamed to Kauravi, after the Kuru Kingdom of ancient India. Although the term Khariboli continues to be applied as it traditionally was, some linguists have accepted the term Kauravi as well, applying to the language spoken in the linguistic arc running from Saharanpur to Agra (i.e. the close east and northeast of Old Delhi). Sankrityayan postulated that this Kaurvi dialect was the parent of Old Delhi's specific Khari dialect. Sankrityayan had also advocated that all Hindustani be standardized on the Devanagari script and Perso-Arabic entirely is abandoned.

Other dialects of Hindustani
Khariboli is related to four registers of Hindustani, the lingua franca of northern India and Pakistan: Standard Hindi, Standard Urdu, Dakhini and Rekhta. Standard Hindi (also High Hindi, Manak Hindi) is the language of the government and is one of the official languages of India, Standard Urdu is the state language and national language of Pakistan, Dakhini is the historical literary dialect of the Deccan region, and Rekhta the "mixed" Hindustani of medieval poetry. These registers, together with Sansiboli, form the Hindustani dialect group. This group, together with Braj Bhasha, Kanauji and Bundeli, forms the Western dialect set of Hindi languages.

Early influences
The area around Delhi has long been the center of power in northern India, and naturally, the Khari Boli dialect came to be regarded as urbane and of a higher standard than the other dialects of Hindi. This view gradually gained ground over the 19th century; before that period, other dialects such as Awadhi, Braj Bhasha, and Sadhukaddi were the dialects preferred by littérateurs.
Standard Hindustani first developed with the migration of Persian Khari Boli speakers from Delhi to the Awadh region—most notably Amir Khusro, mixing the 'roughness' of Khari Boli with the relative 'softness' of Awadhi to form a new language which they called "Hindavi." This also became referred to as Hindustani, which subsequently diverged into Hindi and Urdu.

Although as a dialect, Khari Boli belongs to the Upper Doab, "Hindavi" developed in the cultural spheres of Allahabad and Varanasi.

Rise as the basis for Standard Hindustani

The earliest examples of Khariboli can be seen in the compositions of Amir Khusro (1253–1325).

Before the rise of Khariboli, the literary dialects of Hindi were the ones adopted by the Bhakti saints: Braj Bhasha (Krishna devotees), Awadhi (adopted by the Rama devotees) and Maithili (Vaishnavites of Bihar). However, after the Bhakti movement became ritualistic, these languages came to be regarded as rural and unrefined. Khariboli, on the other hand, was spoken in the urban area surrounding the Mughal courts, where Persian was the official language. The Persian-influenced Khariboli thus gradually came to be regarded as a prestige dialect, although hardly any literary works had been written in Khariboli before the British period in India.

The British administrators of India and the Christian missionaries played an important role in the creation and promotion of the Khariboli-based Modern Standard Hindustani. In 1800, the British East India Company established a college of higher education at Calcutta named the Fort William College. John Borthwick Gilchrist, a president of that college, encouraged his professors to write in their native tongue; some of the works thus produced were in the literary form of the Khariboli dialect. These books included Premsagar by Lallu Lal, Nasiketopakhyan by Sadal Mishra; Sukhsagar by Sadasukh Lal of Delhi and Rani Ketaki Ki Kahani by Inshallah Khan. More developed forms of Khariboli can also be seen in some mediocre literature produced in the early 18th century. Examples are Chand Chhand Varnan Ki Mahima by Ganga Bhatt, Yogavashishtha by Ram Prasad Niranjani, Gora Badal Ki Katha by Jatmal, Mandovar Ka Varnan by Anonymous, a translation of Ravishenacharya's Jain Padmapuran by Daulat Ram (dated 1761). With government patronage and literary popularity, the Khariboli flourished, even as the use of previously more literary tongues such as Awadhi, Braj, and Maithili declined in the literary vehicles. The literary works in Khariboli gained momentum from the second half of the 19th century onwards. A prominent Indian historian Raja Sivaprasad was a promoter of the Hindi language, in particular the Khariboli version. Gradually, in the subsequent years, Khariboli became the basis for standard Hindustani, which began to be taught in schools and used in government functions.

Urdu, the heavily Persianised version of Khariboli, replaced Persian as the official language of local administration in North India in the early 19th century. However, the association of Urdu with the Muslims prompted Hindus to develop their own Sanskritised version of the dialect, leading to the formation of Modern Standard Hindi. After India became independent in 1947, the Khariboli-based dialect was officially recognised as the approved version of the Hindi language, which was declared as one of the official languages for central government functioning.

See also
Standard Hindi
Standard Urdu
Awadhi language
Dakhini

References

Hindi languages
Hindustani
Indian words and phrases